Chanthupottu is a 2005 Indian Malayalam-language romantic comedy-drama film directed by Lal Jose, written by Benny P. Nayarambalam, and produced by Lal. The film was based on a play of the same name, which in turn, was based on the life of an actual man with feminine mannerisms. The story is about a man named Radhakrishnan (Dileep) who was brought up like a girl by his grandmother. This film was a commercial success at the box office.

Plot

Radhakrishnan is brought up like a girl by his grandmother who wanted a granddaughter. She calls him Radha, which becomes his nickname. Radha's father Divakaran  goes to jail for a murder that he accidentally commits. Radha is ridiculed among the people in the village as he is considered effeminate, but he is not worried and spends time with the girls singing and teaches dancing. His best friend is Malu  who is wooed by Kumaran, a local money lender and the son of the man whom Radha's father had killed in a fight after Kumaran harasses Radha for behaving like girl.

Divakaran comes back from jail and dislikes his son's mannerisms, but can do nothing about them. Slowly Radha's liking for Malu turns into love and when Kumaran sees it, he beats up Radha with the help of her father, a local astrologer and dumps him in deep sea by saying he is a curse to the shore. But he is saved by Freddy, a restaurant owner, in some distant shore. Freddy takes him to the former's native where he is living with his sister Rosie and his grandmother, who is a mental patient due to the shock of the sudden death of Freddy's other sibling, Jonfy. He soon becomes a part of their family, as the grandmother begins to identify him as the late Jonfy.  With a change in environment, he also changes his behaviour, adopting more traditionally male mannerisms.

Once, he gets involved in a fight with Cleetus, an old enemy of Freddy, after Cleetus tries to molest Rosie. During the fight, Cleetus gets severely injured on the head. Radha is forced to return to his home to escape from the police.

On reaching his native shore, he discovers that his family, along with his house was brutally burned down by Kumaran. He also learns that Malu is pregnant with Radha's child. His arrival follows a fight with Kumaran. Towards the end of the fight, Radha defeats Kumaran and is about to kill him but, reminded of how his  father had to suffer in jail due to murder charges, he spares Kumaran. In the meantime, Malu  prematurely gives birth to Radha's child. When Radha sees the child, he vows to raise it as a boy, ripping off the ribbon tied to its hair.

Cast

Portrayal of gender roles
The film was criticized by the LGBT community of Kerala for its distorted portrayal of gender and sexuality. In 2019, queer activists reported that the word "chanthupottu" was used to harass transgender persons, and pointed at the deeply problematic idea that beatings and a heterosexual relationship could "correct" behaviour that goes against traditional gender norms. Prabhakaran and Poovathingal (2013) argue that "the movie brought forth traditional machismo of the male hero and defined an unsophisticated masculinity", despite its attempts to portray an effeminate man in a positive light. Director Lal Jose responded to the claims by saying that "In the movie, Radha or Radhakrishnan is a man, he is not a transgender person. There is no doubt about his gender. He falls in love with a woman, has a child from the woman. The only thing was that he had an effeminate aspect to his behaviour. There is no gender issue in that film.”

Music

 "Azhakadalinte" – S. Janaki  
 "Azhakadalinte" (Male) - P Jayachandran
 "Omanapuzha" – Vineeth Sreenivasan
 "Chanthu Kudanjoru" – Shahabaz Aman, Sujatha Mohan
 "Kana Ponnum" – Franko, Ranjith, Chorus

References

External links
 
 Chaanthupottu at the Malayalam Movie Database

2005 films
Transgender-related films
Cross-dressing in Indian films
Bisexuality-related films
Indian LGBT-related films
2000s Malayalam-language films
2005 romantic comedy-drama films
Films shot in Alappuzha
LGBT-related romantic comedy-drama films
Indian romantic comedy-drama films
Films scored by Vidyasagar
Films directed by Lal Jose
2005 LGBT-related films